Șovarna is a commune located in Mehedinți County, Oltenia, Romania. It is composed of three villages: Ohaba, Studina and Șovarna.

References

Communes in Mehedinți County
Localities in Oltenia